Rhynchopyga hymenopteridia is a species of moth in the subfamily Arctiinae. It is found in Bolivia.

References

Natural History Museum Lepidoptera generic names catalog

Moths described in 1911
Euchromiina